Belonoglanis is a genus of catfishes (order Siluriformes) of the family Amphiliidae. Both species occur in the Congo River basin.

Species 
There are currently two recognized species in this genus:
 Belonoglanis brieni Poll, 1959
 Belonoglanis tenuis Boulenger, 1902

References

Amphiliidae

Catfish genera
Taxa named by George Albert Boulenger
Freshwater fish genera